Walter "Wally" Firth (born January 25, 1935) is a former Canadian politician.

A Métis, Firth was the first Native politician from the North to win a seat in the House of Commons of Canada. He served as the New Democratic Party Member of Parliament for the Northwest Territories during the 1970s. He was first elected to the House of Commons of Canada in the 1972 federal election and re-elected in 1974. He did not run for re-election in 1979, but attempted to return to the House of Commons in the 1980 election. He was defeated in the riding of Western Arctic.

In private life, Firth had various careers as an airplane pilot, flying instructor, broadcaster and fur trader. He was also active as a Native rights advocate.

Firth made another attempt to return to the House of Commons in the 1997 federal election, this time running as an Independent in Western Arctic, but was again unsuccessful.

Firth subsequently returned to the New Democratic Party attempting to win the party's nomination in Yukon for the 2004 election but was unsuccessful.

Electoral history

References

External links
 

1935 births
Living people
Members of the House of Commons of Canada from the Northwest Territories
New Democratic Party MPs
First Nations politicians
Métis politicians
Canadian Métis people
Indigenous Members of the House of Commons of Canada